is an English trusts law case, concerning breach of trust and knowing receipt of trust property.

Facts
The liquidators of BCCI  sued Chief Labode Onadimaki Akindele, a Nigerian businessman, for $6,679,226 that he got in divestiture payments in 1988. ICIC Overseas Ltd, in the BCCI group, had agreed Akindele would buy shares in BCCI Holdings, and be guaranteed a 15% pa return for a $10m investment. BCCI, in fact, gave him $16.679m to do this, thus leaving $6.679m over. Akindele did not know this was part of a fraud scheme to enable BCCI Holdings to buy its own shares. The liquidator argued he was a constructive trustee, for both knowing receipt and knowing assistance. The liquidators argued his dishonesty could be inferred from his knowledge of the artificially arranged loan transactions and his unusually high-interest rate of 15%.

The High Court refused recovery and refused to find him dishonest.

Judgment
Nourse LJ held that Mr Akindele’s knowledge in 1985 was not enough to make the transaction unconscionable, and for him to retain the benefits of the divestiture payments, even though there were rumours about BCCI’s management. There was nothing to alert Mr Akindele to the transaction being tainted. Dishonesty was not needed to establish liability for knowing receipt as a constructive trustee, Belmont Finance Corp v Williams Furniture Ltd (No 2) [1980] 1 All ER 393 considered. The degrees of knowledge in Baden was unhelpful and a single test of unconscionability was better. Even if constructive knowledge was still the test, Mr Akindele did not have constructive knowledge of the breach of trust by BCCI management.

Ward LJ and Sedley LJ concurred.

See also

English trusts law

Notes

References

English trusts case law
Court of Appeal (England and Wales) cases
2000 in British law
2000 in case law